The Research Organization for Social Sciences and Humanities (OR-IPSH), but goes by name Institute of Social Sciences and Humanities-BRIN or ISSH-BRIN, is one of Research Organizations under the umbrella of the National Research and Innovation Agency (BRIN). It was founded on 1 September 2021 as transformation of Deputy IV (Social Sciences and Humanities) of Indonesian Institute of Sciences (LIPI) after the liquidation of LIPI into BRIN.

On 24 January 2022, it is announced that the organization extended with fusion of elements from various elements from General Secretariat of People's Consultative Assembly, General Secretariat of Regional Representative Council, General Secretariat of People's Representative Council, former Agency for Research and Development and Book Affairs of the Ministry of Education and Culture (now Ministry of Education, Culture, Research and Technology), Ministry of Law and Human Rights, Ministry of Religious Affairs, National Population and Family Planning Agency, Ministry of Agrarian Affairs and Spatial Planning/National Land Agency. Total number of researchers at this institute is around 400 people.

History 
Founded on 1 September 2021, OR-IPSH is transformation of Deputy IV (Social Sciences and Humanities) of LIPI after the liquidation of LIPI into BRIN. As a research organization of BRIN, as outlined in Article 175 and Article 176 of Chief of BRIN Decree No. 1/2021, every Research Organizations under BRIN are responsible and answered to Chief of BRIN. It also prescribed that the Research Organizations consisted with Head of Research Organizations, Centers, and Laboratories/Study Groups. For the transitional period, as in Article 210 of Chief of BRIN Decree No. 1/2021 mandated, the structure of OR-IPSH follows the preceding structure that already established during its time in LIPI. Due to this, the structure of ORIPSH follows the Chief of LIPI Decree No. 24/2020.

On 22 September 2021, OR-IPSH constituting document, Chief of BRIN Decree No. 10/2021, signed by Laksana Tri Handoko and fully published on 8 October 2021.

On 24 January 2022, it is announced that the organization extended with fusion from various elements for former research and development of various governmental agencies, significantly expanding the structure of OR-IPSH. The new structure will be effective from 1 February 2022. OR-IPSH formation is finalized on 1 March 2022 and is functional since 4 March 2022 since inauguration of its first head, Ahmad Najib Burhani.

Preceding Agencies 
Based on the structure of the current OR-IPSH, the preceding agencies of the OR-IPSH were:

 Center for Research and Development of the National Population and Family Planning Agency 
 Center for Development and Standardization of Agrarian Affairs and Spatial Planning Policies of the Ministry of Agrarian Affairs and Spatial Planning/National Land Agency
 General Secretariat of People's Consultative Assembly
 General Secretariat of Regional Representative Council 
 General Secretariat of People's Representative Council 
 Agency for Law and Human Rights Research and Development of the Ministry of Law and Human Rights 
 former Agency for Research and Development and Book Affairs of the Ministry of Education and Culture
 Research, Development, Education, and Training Agency of the Ministry of Religious Affairs

Structure 
The structure of ORIPSH is as follows:

 Office of the Chairman of OR-IPSH
 Research Center for Society and Culture
 Research Center for Politics
 Research Center for Population
 Research Center for Area Studies
 Research Center for Law
 Research Center for Education
 Research Center for Religious Harmony and Moderation
 Research Center for Religion and Belief
 Research Groups

List of Head

References 

Science and technology in Indonesia
2021 establishments in Indonesia
Research institutes in Indonesia
National Research and Innovation Agency